The 2021 Western Australian state election was conducted on Saturday 13 March 2021 to elect members to the Parliament of Western Australia, where all 59 seats in the Legislative Assembly and all 36 seats in the Legislative Council were up for election.

The incumbent Labor Government, led by Premier Mark McGowan, won a second consecutive four-year term in office in a historic landslide victory. Their primary challengers were the opposition Liberal Party, led by Opposition Leader Zak Kirkup, and the National Party, led by Mia Davies. Several minor parties also contested the election in the Assembly and Council.

ABC News psephologist Antony Green called the election for the Labor Party 42 minutes after the polls closed, with 0.7% of the vote counted. Labor won 53 out of 59 of the seats in the Assembly, outdoing its previous record of 41 seats in 2017, whilst the Liberals had a wipeout loss and won only two seats, suffering a 14% two-party preferred swing. The Nationals claimed the four remaining seats and became the largest opposition party in the Assembly. To date, the election is the most decisive result at any Australian state or federal election since Federation in terms of percentage of lower house seats controlled by the governing party (89.8%), and two-party preferred margin (69.7%–30.3%). Labor's unprecedented victory extended to the Legislative Council, and the party claimed a majority of the seats in the upper house for the first time.

Candidates were elected to single-member seats in the Legislative Assembly via full-preferential instant-runoff voting. In the Legislative Council, six candidates were elected in each of the six electoral regions through the single transferable vote system with group voting tickets. The election was conducted by the Western Australian Electoral Commission.

Results

Legislative Assembly

Although the Liberals and Nationals did not contest the election as a coalition and are separate parties, the two-party-preferred calculation aggregates Labor/Liberal and Labor/Nationals contests.

Seats changing parties

Labor's victory was built on a near-sweep of Perth. Labor had gone into the election holding 33 of Perth's 43 seats (having lost one at a by-election). It won an additional nine in 2021, some on swings of over 10 percent, leaving Cottesloe as the only non-Labor seat in the capital. Many of Labor's gains came in seats long considered Liberal heartland. For example, Nedlands, the seat of former Liberal premiers Charles and Richard Court, fell to Labor for the first time since its creation in 1930, while South Perth was taken by Labor for the first time since its creation in 1950.

Among the more prominent casualties was Opposition Leader Zak Kirkup, who was heavily defeated in his own seat of Dawesville on a swing of over 14 percent, and former opposition leader Liza Harvey, whose seat of Scarborough fell to a 16 percent swing.

On paper, Labor was left as the only party with official status in the legislature, as no other party won at least five seats. However, McGowan promised that the Nationals would be properly resourced as an opposition, envisaging that they would divide opposition funding with the Liberals.

Legislative Council

Distribution of seats

Background

The 2017 state election saw Labor win one of the most comprehensive victories on record at the state or territory level in Australia. Labor won 41 of the 59 seats in the Legislative Assembly—a 23-seat majority—both WA Labor's strongest result ever, and the largest government seat tally and largest government majority in Western Australian parliamentary history. Additionally, Labor exceeded all published opinion polling, winning 55.5 percent of the two-party-preferred vote from a state record landslide 12.8 percent two-party swing. The Liberals were hit by a 15.8% swing against them on the primary vote and lost 18 seats to Labor, finishing with just 13 seats, the lowest share of seats the party has won in any election. The Nationals won the remaining five seats. Labor also became the largest party in the Legislative Council with 14 of the 36 seats, ensuring it required at least five additional votes from non-government members to pass legislation.

Two by-elections were held during the term of parliament, both in 2018. The Liberal Party held the seat of Cottesloe and picked up the seat Darling Range, increasing the Liberal/National bloc in the Assembly to 19 and decreasing the Labor Party to 40. In July/August 2019, Liberal MP Ian Blayney resigned from the party and joined the Nationals, thus returning the Liberal vote bloc to 13 and increasing the National vote bloc to 6.

In the lead up to the election, Premier Mark McGowan had high approval ratings over his handling of the COVID-19 pandemic. Opinion polls pegged the McGowan Government as unbackable favourites for a second term, and suggested that Labor would be re-elected by a record majority. Labor enjoyed support approaching 70% in the two-party preferred polls, and McGowan maintained a personal approval rating of 88%. On 25 February 2021, 16 days before Election Day, Leader of the Opposition Zak Kirkup conceded that the Liberals could not win the election, citing polling indicating immense popularity for McGowan and the Labor Government. Kirkup said that his main priority was ensuring the Liberals would be able to form a credible opposition, arguing that a Liberal party room reduced to the single digits would be in no position to stop Labor if it went "too far."

Electoral system 
Candidates are elected to single-member seats in the Legislative Assembly via full-preferential instant-runoff voting. In the Legislative Council, six candidates are elected in each of the six electoral regions through the single transferable vote system with group voting tickets.

Registered parties 
The following parties contested the election:

 Animal Justice Party
 Australian Christians
 Daylight Saving Party
 Great Australian Party
 Greens Western Australia
 Health Australia Party
 Labor Party
 Legalise Cannabis Western Australia Party
 Liberal Party
 Liberal Democratic Party

 Liberals for Climate
 National Party of Australia
 No Mandatory Vaccination Party
 Pauline Hanson's One Nation
 Shooters, Fishers and Farmers Party
 Socialist Alliance
 Sustainable Australia
 WAxit Party
 Western Australia Party

Key dates
Election dates are set in statute with four-year fixed terms, to be held on the second Saturday of March every four years.

Key dates for the election are:

Retiring MPs

Labor
Janine Freeman MLA (Mirrabooka) – announced 25 November 2020
Josie Farrer MLA (Kimberley) – announced 18 August 2020
Fran Logan MLA (Cockburn) – announced 31 August 2020
Mick Murray MLA (Collie-Preston) – announced 9 February 2020
Peter Watson MLA (Albany) – announced 10 February 2020
Ben Wyatt MLA (Victoria Park) – announced 16 November 2020
Adele Farina MLC (South West) – lost preselection, announced retirement 26 June 2020
Laurie Graham MLC (Agricultural) – announced 21 July 2020

Liberal
John McGrath MLA (South Perth) – announced 30 October 2019
Mike Nahan MLA (Riverton) – announced 2 December 2019
Dean Nalder MLA (Bateman) – announced 1 December 2020
Ken Baston MLC (Mining and Pastoral) – announced 2 December 2019
Simon O'Brien MLC (South Metropolitan) – lost preselection 3 February 2020, did not renominate

Nationals
Jacqui Boydell MLC (Mining and Pastoral) – announced 21 February 2020
Colin Holt MLC (South West) – announced 19 August 2020

Greens
Robin Chapple MLC (Mining and Pastoral) – announced 27 February 2020

Campaign/candidate controversies
In January 2021, Liberal Party candidate for Victoria Park Amanda-Sue Markham defended her husband's controversial views on homosexuality and conversion therapy. Despite calls for her to do so, she did not withdraw from the election.

Additionally, the Liberal Party candidate for Baldivis, Andrea Tokaji, was forced to resign from the Liberal Party after making discredited claims about a link between 5G towers and COVID-19. She continued as an Independent candidate for Baldivis, with the Liberal Party selecting Luke Derrick as her replacement.

In March 2021, One Nation dumped Roger Barnett as its candidate for the seat of Forrestfield after offensive Muslim and Aboriginal comments emerged from his Facebook page that were posted between 2012 and 2018. It was also reported later that another One Nation candidate had comments that were offensive towards Muslim and African people.

Redistribution 
A redistribution of electoral boundaries for the lower house was announced on 27 November 2019. The changes did not result in a district changing party status notionally based on the new boundaries. However, the districts of Hillarys and Joondalup became far more marginal, with margins of 0.4 and 0.03 respectively. There was one seat renamed in due to the boundary changes, with Girrawheen becoming the new district of Landsdale. Ten districts were not affected by boundary changes.

Electoral pendulums

Pre-election pendulum
This is a pre-election pendulum, taking into account the 2019 boundary redistribution. Estimated margins are calculated by Antony Green for the Western Australian Parliamentary Library. Retiring members are shown in italics.

Post-election pendulum

Opinion polling

Newspaper endorsements

Demographic trends
While all electorates swung towards Labor, there was some correlation between certain characteristics (demographics as measured by the 2016 Australian Census) and the magnitude of the two-party-preferred swing to Labor in each electorate. This does not necessarily imply a causal relationship but rather some similarities between electoral districts which moved more or less towards the Labor party on the two-party-preferred.

Incumbent MP
Electoral districts which were flipped by a Labor candidate at the last election (e.g. the electoral district of Joondalup, which was a Liberal-held district prior to the 2017 Western Australian state election) saw a bigger swing to Labor than similar districts which were already Labor-held or which had not changed hands. Districts where a Labor incumbent retired (e.g. electoral district of Albany) saw a smaller swing to Labor than similar districts where there were no Labor retirements.

Age
Electoral districts with a high proportion of persons aged 60 years or older swung less to Labor than the rest of the state (R = 0.2, p < 0.001), even after adjusting for the incumbency effect mentioned above.

Occupation
Electoral districts with a high proportion of persons working in clerical or administrative jobs swung more to Labor than the rest of the state (R = 0.12, p < 0.01). This may be confounded by the fact that most such electorates are inner-city Perth electorates and therefore this may be more a factor of inner-city Perth swinging harder to Labor than the rest of the state, and not due to clerical/administrative-heavy electorates swinging to Labor per se.

Language
Electorates with a higher proportion of persons who spoke a language other than English at home also somewhat swung more to Labor than the rest of the state (R = 0.08, p < 0.05).

See also
2020 Liberal Party of Australia (Western Australian Division) leadership election
Candidates of the 2021 Western Australian state election
Members of the Western Australian Legislative Assembly, 2017–2021
Members of the Western Australian Legislative Council, 2017–2021

References

External links
 Western Australian Electoral Commission: 2021 State General Election
 ABC Elections: 2021 West Australian Election Guide
 The Poll Bludger: Western Australian Election 2021
 The Tally Room: Western Australia 2021

Elections in Western Australia
2021 elections in Australia
2020s in Western Australia
Landslide victories